The 1997 Eastern Michigan Eagles football team represented Eastern Michigan University in the 1997 NCAA Division I-A football season. In their third season under head coach Rick Rasnick, the Eagles compiled a 4–7 record (4–5 against conference opponents), finished in fourth place in the West Division of the Mid-American Conference, and were outscored by their opponents, 352 to 329. The team's statistical leaders included Charlie Batch with 3,280 passing yards, Savon Edwards with 627 rushing yards, and Ta-if Kumasi with 710 receiving yards. Batch went on to play 15 years in the National Football League.

Schedule

References

Eastern Michigan
Eastern Michigan Eagles football seasons
Eastern Michigan Eagles football